FC Oshmyany was a Belarusian football club based in Ashmyany (Oshmyany), Grodno Oblast.

History
The club was founded in 2012 as Slavyanin Minsk and was originally based in Minsk. Slavyanin participated in Minsk-based amateur leagues in 2012–2013 and joined Belarusian Second League in 2014. In spring 2015, it was decided by team management to relocate the club to the town of Oshmyany and rename it accordingly (FC Oshmyany).

In 2016, FC Oshmyany, who finished 5th in last year's Second League season, were promoted to the Belarusian First League as a replacement for a few withdrawn clubs.

References

External links

Association football clubs established in 2012
Association football clubs established in 2015
Association football clubs disestablished in 2021
Football clubs in Belarus
2012 establishments in Belarus
2021 disestablishments in Belarus
Grodno Region